The Match King is a 1932 American Pre-Code drama film made by First National Pictures, directed by William Keighley and Howard Bretherton. The film starred Warren William and Lili Damita, and follows the rise and fall of Swedish safety match tycoon Ivar Kreuger. Based on the novel by Einar Thorvaldson, the film was released on December 31, 1932.

Plot
Though a lowly Chicago street cleaner, Swedish immigrant Paul Kroll is ambitious and unscrupulous. When a fellow employee is fired (due to one of Kroll's schemes), Kroll convinces his foreman to keep him on the payroll (officially at least) so they can split his salary. Soon there are eight "phantom" workers, and Kroll and his partner have amassed enough money for a ticket back to Sweden. However, Kroll has been romancing his partner's wife, Babe, behind his back.

Meanwhile, he has also been lying to the people of his hometown in Sweden, telling them what a successful businessman he has become. As a result, when the local match factory is in trouble, his uncle begs him to return and save it. Kroll gets Babe to withdraw the money he has stolen, deceiving her into thinking they are running away together, then leaves her behind as he sails away to Sweden.

He cons the local bank into giving him a loan to buy a second match factory so he can merge them. Only his old friend Erik Borg knows the truth about Kroll's "success", so Kroll recruits him as his all-too-trusting second in command in his expanding business. Though corrupt, he is also a brilliant business visionary and eventually Kroll owns all of the match factories in Sweden. However, his ambitions do not stop there. Using information he obtains from beautiful, well-placed women he has charmed, he gains official match monopolies, first in Poland, then in Germany and other countries, by offering loans to cash-strapped governments and bribes to corrupt officials.

While dining with Ilse Wagner, one of his conquests, he is dazzled by the beauty of rising actress Marta Molnar. Despite her initial rebuffs, he goes to great lengths to win her heart, even hiring a celebrated "gypsy violinist" to serenade her. Uncharacteristically, he dangerously neglects his business, financed by an ever-growing series of loans. When Marta leaves for Hollywood, he reluctantly returns his attention to his company. One of his agents discovers that an eccentric recluse named Christian Hobe has invented an everlasting match, so Kroll has him locked away as a madman.

When the stock market crashes, Kroll no longer can obtain a bank loan. In desperation, he buys $50 million in fake Italian bonds from forger Scarlatti, whom he then dumps in the middle of a lake to drown. With the bonds as collateral, he obtains a $40 million loan from an American bank. Marta has returned to Sweden and Kroll thinks of retiring, but when he asks Marta to marry him, he discovers that, in his frequent absences, she has fallen in love with Trino, the gypsy violinist. Much worse, his forgeries are detected, and his American loan is canceled. Kroll shoots himself on the balcony and his body tumbles into the gutter, where he started.

Cast

Preservation
A print of the film is held at the Library of Congress.

See also
Night of January 16th, a play also inspired by Ivar Kreuger

References

External links

1932 films
1932 drama films
American black-and-white films
1930s English-language films
Films directed by William Keighley
Films directed by Howard Bretherton
First National Pictures films
Ivar Kreuger
American drama films
1932 directorial debut films
1930s American films
Films scored by Bernhard Kaun
Films set in Chicago